To Gillian on Her 37th Birthday is a 1996 American romantic drama film directed by Michael Pressman and starring Peter Gallagher and Claire Danes as a father and daughter struggling to come to terms with the tragic death of wife and mother, Gillian (Michelle Pfeiffer). The original score was composed by James Horner.

The screenplay was adapted by David E. Kelley from the play of the same name by Michael Brady.

Plot
David Lewis (Peter Gallagher) is so affected by the death of his beautiful wife, Gillian (Michelle Pfeiffer), who fell from the mast of their yacht on a sailing trip, that he turns their summer cottage in Nantucket, Massachusetts into a permanent home and spends most of his time on the beach there, communicating with Gillian's spirit and unwittingly neglecting his daughter, Rachel (Claire Danes).

On the second anniversary of Gillian's death, David invites her sister, Esther Wheeler (Kathy Baker), and Esther's husband, Paul (Bruce Altman), to stay for the weekend. She insists on bringing a friend named Kevin Dollof (Wendy Crewson) who she hopes David will become romantically interested in. He, however, ignores her in proceeding with a ritualistic celebration of Gillian's birthday.

The events of the weekend cause the adults to re-examine their relationships; Esther and Paul have to deal with the problem posed to their marriage by Rachel's provocative friend, Cindy (Laurie Fortier), while David comes to realize that he can be a loving and attentive father to Rachel without betraying the memory of Gillian.

Cast
 Peter Gallagher as David Lewis
 Michelle Pfeiffer as Gillian Lewis
 Claire Danes as Rachel Lewis
 Laurie Fortier as Cindy Bayles
 Wendy Crewson as Kevin Dollof
 Bruce Altman as Paul Wheeler
 Kathy Baker as Esther Wheeler
 Freddie Prinze Jr. as Joey Bost
 Rachel Seidman-Lockamy as Megan Weeks
 Seth Green as Danny

Production
The film was filmed on location in Nantucket, Massachusetts, and in and around Wilmington, North Carolina, although some of the beach scenes were filmed at Long Beach, California, and the sailing accident was filmed at Marina del Rey, California; the obvious differences between the two were noticeable enough to be mentioned by The New York Times reviewer Janet Maslin.

Reception
The film holds a rating of 14% on Rotten Tomatoes based on 29 reviews, indicating an overwhelmingly negative critical response.

Emanuel Levy in Variety described the film as "a bargain-basement Ghost, a hybrid of an earnest, inspirational play and a sleek, calculated Lifetime telepic." Janet Maslin, in the New York Times, wrote: "It's not easy for the story's tear-jerking potential to be realized when its characters express their pain as if they were writing greeting cards." Rita Kempley of The Washington Post wrote that "for all the moonlight and magic, the film scares up little in the way of enchantment."

Many critics found it difficult to accept the basic premise, that the main character's continued mourning of his deceased wife is so detrimental to those around him. Roger Ebert, in particular, expressed frustration: "The movie cannot see that Esther is a deranged nuisance who should mind her own business, that David is entitled to his grief, that Rachel is happy living on the island, and that if Gillian appears to David, so much the better." Jack Matthews of the Los Angeles Times wrote: "Despite its apparent parallels to Ghost, Gillian takes an entirely opposite path. Throughout Ghost, we were made to feel desperate for a reunion of Patrick Swayze's roaming spirit with a mourning Demi Moore. In Gillian, the whole purpose is to get David to give up the ghost." Mick LaSalle of the San Francisco Chronicle thought the film lacked dramatic impetus: "the grieving husband never quite seems crazy enough - and the sister is never angry enough...drama is avoided. Issues are muddy. And everyone stays a nice person... In fact, typical of the film's undramatic choices - it's ungenerous unwillingness to commit to the extreme - the husband knows she [Gillian] is an illusion. So he's not crazy. She's not a ghost. And the sister-in-law, far from evil, is merely concerned. So why are we watching these people?"

One aspect that garnered unanimous praise was Danes' performance as the troubled daughter. Levy wrote, "Danes proves again that she's one of the most naturally gifted actresses of her generation." Maslin described her as "especially expressive in the film's later scenes, demonstrating a rare ability to seem fresh and honest when her material quite clearly is not." Matthews wrote, "Danes is terrific playing an awkward teenager trying to understand her father's problems while feeling the first stirrings of passion in herself." Kempley wrote of Danes, "the gifted actress steals the show."

Accolades
Claire Danes won a Young Artist Award for Best Performance in a Feature Film - Supporting Young Actress.

References

External links
 
 

American romantic drama films
American films based on plays
Films set in Massachusetts
Films directed by Michael Pressman
Films shot in Massachusetts
Films shot in North Carolina
American independent films
1996 romantic drama films
Triumph Films films
Films scored by James Horner
Films about grieving
1996 independent films
1996 films
Films about widowhood
1990s English-language films
1990s American films